Winston Manor may refer to:

Winston Manor (Devon)
Winston Manor (Isle of Wight)
Winston Manor Hotel, Bristol